Erik Arvinder (born 1984) is a Swedish violinist, multi-instrumentalist, arranger, orchestrator and conductor known for his work with artists such as Avicii, Childish Gambino, John Legend, Galantis and deadmau5.

Early life and influences 
Arvinder was born and raised in Stockholm, Sweden. He completed undergraduate and graduate studies in violin performance at the Royal College of Music in Stockholm.

Career 
Arvinder began his career as a violinist and was a member of the Royal Stockholm Philharmonic Orchestra from 2008 to 2012. He has served as concertmaster for multiple Nordic ensembles and is one of the founding members of the Vamlingbo Quartet.

Between 2011 and 2013, Arvinder toured as a multi-instrumentalist with Childish Gambino playing violin, keyboard and percussion during the I Am Donald and Camp tours.

In 2014, Arvinder toured as a violinist with John Legend during the All Of Me tour,

Arvinder has worked as an arranger for multiple international music artists, including Avicii, Zara Larsson, deadmau5, Galantis & Childish Gambino. Arvinder worked as an orchestrator for the 2015 film Creed, and continued to orchestrate for multiple films and television shows, including the Netflix musical comedy The Prom, NBC comedy Community and Netflix documentary series Chef's Table.

In 2017, together with Anthony Gonzalez (M83) and Chris Hartz (Passion Pit), Arvinder arranged and orchestrated the Cirque du Soleil show Volta.

As a multi-instrumentalist, Arvinder is a member of the band in the Swedish reality television music show Så mycket bättre.

Selected discography 

Lord Huron - Your Other Life (2022) - Conductor
FOX - Monarch (2022) - String arranger, conductor
Netflix - Chef's Table Pizza (2022) - Orchestrator, conductor
Jake Wesley Rogers - Hindsight (2022) - String arranger, conductor
First Aid Kit - Palomino (2022) - String arranger, conductor
Becky Hill & Galantis - Run (2022) - String arranger, conductor
Nisa Nesbitt - When You Lose Someone (2022) - String arranger, conductor
Lord Huron - Long Lost (2021) - Conductor
The Knocks & Dragonette - Slow Song (2021) - String arranger, conductor
Galantis & Years & Years - Sweet Talker (2021) - String arranger, conductor
Royal Stockholm Philharmonic Orchestra & Ella Tiritiello - For A Better Day (2021) -  Producer, arranger, conductor
Netflix - The Prom (2020) - Lead orchestrator, conductor
Galantis - Hurricane (with John Newman) (2020) - String arranger, conductor
Galantis & Dolly Parton - Faith (feat. Mr. Probz) (2019) - String arranger, conductor
James Arthur - Quite Miss Home (2019) - String arranger, conductor
deadmau5 - Where's The Drop? (2018) - Arranger
John Williams - Star Wars: The Last Jedi - Original motion picture soundtrack (2017) - Violin
Morrisey - Low in High School (2017) - Viola
Justin Timberlake & Mitchell Owens - The Book of Love - Original motion picture soundtrack (2017) - Violin
Harry Styles - Harry Styles (2017) - Violin
Katelyn Tarver - Tired Eyes (2017) - String arranger, conductor
Galantis - The Aviary (2017) - String arranger, conductor
Anastacia - Evolution (2017) - String arranger, conductor
Lady Antebellum - Heart Break (2017) - Viola
 Netflix - Chef's Table - (2017-2018) - Orchestrator
Cirque du Soleil - Paramour (2016) - Arranger
Cirque du Soleil - Volta (2016) - Arranger, orchestrator
Michael Bublé - Nobody but Me (2016) - Violin
Ludwig Göransson - Central Intelligence - Original motion picture soundtrack - (2016) - Orchestrator, violin
Theodore Shapiro - Ghostbusters - Original motion picture soundtrack (2016) - Violin
Ludwig Göransson - Creed - Original motion picture soundtrack (2015) - Orchestrator, violin
Joshua Radin - Onward and Sideways (2015) - String arranger, conductor
Demi Lovato - Confident (2015) - Violin
Avicii - Stories (2015) - String arranger, conductor
John Williams - Star Wars: The Force Awakens - Original motion picture soundtrack (2015) - Violin
Ellie Goulding - Delirium (2015), Violin
Zara Larsson - Introducing EP (2014), String arranger, conductor
Lupe Fiasco - Stellar Light (2014) - String arranger, conductor
Lykke Li - I Never Learn (2014) - Violin
Dirty Loops - Loopified (2014) - String arranger, conductor
Childish Gambino - Because the Internet (2013) - String arranger, violin
Tinie Tempah - Demonstration (2013) - String arranger, violin
CeeLo Green - Cee Lo's Magic Moment (2012), Violin
Ludwig Göransson - Community - Television soundtrack (2011-2015) - Orchestrator, conductor, violin
Childish Gambino - Camp (2011) - String arranger, violin
Robyn - Body Talk (2010) - Violin
Lady Gaga - The Fame Monster (2009) - Violin
Alexandra Burke - Overcome (2009) - String arranger, violin
Lykke Li - Youth Novels (2008) - Violin
Peter Bjorn and John - Living Thing (2009) - Violin
Primal Scream - Beautiful Future (2008) - Violin

References

External links
Erik Arvinder playing violin in a String Quartet

Swedish violinists
Swedish music arrangers
Swedish multi-instrumentalists
Royal College of Music, Stockholm alumni
1984 births
Musicians from Stockholm
Living people
21st-century violinists